Seaview Wildlife Encounter, (formerly Flamingo Park), was a wildlife park featuring non-native species of birds and mammals. It opened in 1971 and closed in November 2015. The visitor attraction was located in the town of  Seaview, on the northeast coast of the Isle of Wight. The Isle of Wight is a small British island 3 to 5 mi (5 to 8 km) off the coast of South East England.

Features
Animals at the reserve included meerkats, wallabys, flamingos, pelicans, ducks, swans, alpacas, otters, penguins, and parakeets.

Visitors could feed the ducks and stroke the wallabies.

The site also included a gift shop and cafeteria.

External links

 official Seaview Wildlife Encounter website

Zoos in England
Nature reserves on the Isle of Wight
Tourist attractions on the Isle of Wight
Articles needing infobox zoo
1971 establishments in England
2015 disestablishments in England